Johannes Fabri, O.F.M. (died 1458) was a Roman Catholic prelate who served as Auxiliary Bishop of Paderborn (1437–1458).

Biography
Johannes Fabri was ordained a priest in the Order of Friars Minor. On 13 Sep 1437, he was appointed during the papacy of Pope Eugene IV as Auxiliary Bishop of Paderborn and Titular Bishop of Larissa in Syria. He served as Auxiliary Bishop of Paderborn until his death in 1458. In his will, Fabri provided his library and funding to found a trilingual college at the University of Vienna.

References 

15th-century German Roman Catholic bishops
Bishops appointed by Pope Eugene IV
1458 deaths
Franciscan bishops